Fundin is a lake in the municipalities of Folldal in Innlandet county and Oppdal in Trøndelag county, Norway.  The  lake has a dam at the south end of it, holding back the water for hydroelectric power production, before letting it flow into the Einunna river.

See also
List of lakes in Norway

References

Oppdal
Folldal
Lakes of Innlandet
Lakes of Trøndelag
Reservoirs in Norway